The Men's long jump event  at the 2006 IAAF World Indoor Championships was held on March 10–11.

Medalists

Results

Qualification
Qualifying perf. 7.95 (Q) or 8 best performers (q) advanced to the Final.

Final

References
Results

Long
Long jump at the World Athletics Indoor Championships